Adam Moundir (born 26 April 1995) is a Swiss–Moroccan tennis player. In June 2019, Moundir switched nationalities on the ITF and ATP to represent Morocco.

Moundir has a career high ATP singles ranking of 437 achieved on 18 November 2019. He also has a career high ATP doubles ranking of 529, which was achieved on 2 March 2020.

Moundir has represented Morocco at the Davis Cup.

Future and Challenger finals

Singles: 5 (2–3)

Doubles 14 (4–10)

Davis Cup

Participations: (6–2)

   indicates the outcome of the Davis Cup match followed by the score, date, place of event, the zonal classification and its phase, and the court surface.

References

External links
 
 
 
 
 Old Dominion Monarchs bio

1995 births
Living people
Swiss male tennis players
Moroccan male tennis players
Swiss people of Moroccan descent
Sportspeople from Lucerne
Competitors at the 2019 African Games
African Games silver medalists for Morocco
African Games bronze medalists for Morocco
African Games medalists in tennis
Competitors at the 2022 Mediterranean Games
Mediterranean Games bronze medalists for Morocco
Mediterranean Games medalists in tennis
Old Dominion Monarchs men's tennis players